Rakha Mines are copper mines situated near Jamshedpur in Jharkhand state of India. There is also another copper mine nearby called Kendadih copper mines and refineries at Indian Copper Complex at Ghatshila.

Location and transportation

The nearest airport and big town is Jamshedpur. There is a railway station for the mines, in the same name as Rakha Mines Railway Station, on the Tatanagar-Kharagpur railway line. The station code is RHE. This station is also the nearest railway link to nearby Jaduguda Uranium mines at Jadugora.

History
The first industrial copper mining started at Rakha Mines by a British firm in 1900. After independence the mines were nationalized and are presently being run by a Government of India undertaking, Hindustan Copper Limited, which was formed in 1967.
The name Rakha was put upon the name of Mr. Rakhal Chandra Bhakat. He came from a small Village called Swaspur.  The whole area in which the mines, colony and mill were constructed belongs to him.

References

Copper mines in India
Mining in Jharkhand